Global Credit Data (GCD) (formerly named PECDC or the Pan-European Credit Data Consortium) was formed in December 2004 as a credit data pooling initiative primarily designed to assist member banks' completion of Basel II preparations in their pursuit of Advanced Status for AIRB. Initially it was formed as a loose affiliation of 13 original member banks. GCD now has the largest commercial loan loss and recovery dataset in existence. Membership has grown from the original base of 13 to a membership of 55 banks at September 2021 and the geographic coverage of the GCD databases, originally limited to Europe, have been extended to banks in Africa, Australia and North America. In December 2008 GCD was incorporated as a private not-for-profit legal association, domiciled in The Netherlands under Dutch law.

Role
The role of Global Credit Data is to provide members with an additional credit data collection, analysis and research resource as well as to contribute to a better understanding of credit risk, as put forward in the Articles of Association.

Structure
Global Credit Data is governed by the Board, which comprises at least 7 members appointed by the General Meeting of members for two years. The board is governed by a chairperson and meets at least quarterly. There is also an Executive Director appointed by the board and the General Meeting. There is also a methodology committee charged with all methodological aspects, which is appointed by the board.

Board
Simon Ross-Hansen, Chairman
Sanjay Gupta, Deputy-Chairman
Massimo Cutaia, Treasurer
Stephan Jortzik, Chairman of Methodology Committee
Jean-Gabriel Albigot
Maz Khan

Senior personnel
(TBD), Executive Director 
Nina Brumma, Head of Analytics and Research
Michael Dhaenens, Head of IT, Data & Delivery

References

External links
 Global Credit Data official website

Banking in Europe
Trade associations based in the Netherlands
Organizations established in 2008
Companies based in Rotterdam
Banking organizations